"At My Front Door" is a song written by Ewart Abner and John Moore and performed by The El Dorados. It reached #1 on the U.S. R&B chart and #17 on the U.S. pop chart in 1955.  The song was featured on their 1957 album, Crazy Little Mama.

Song Background
Lyrically, the song warns other men that, if they want to keep their "little mama", they need to keep her "off my street" or she'll end up "knocking at my front door . . . just like she did before".

Other charting versions
Pat Boone released a version of the song as a single in 1955 which reached #7 on the U.S. pop chart and #12 on the U.S. R&B chart.
Dee Clark released a version of the song as a single in 1960 which reached #56 on the U.S. pop chart.

Other versions
The Modernaires released a version of the song as a single in 1955, but it did not chart.
Arthur Lee Maye and the Johnny Otis Orchestra released a version of the song as the B-side to his 1957 single "Honey Love".
The Righteous Brothers released a version of the song as the B-side to their 1965 single "Justine".
Harry Nilsson released a version of the song on his 1972 album Son of Schmilsson and featured in 1974 film Son of Dracula and on its soundtrack.
The Darts released a version of the song as the B-side to their 1977 single "Love Bandit".
Rockats released a version of the song on their 1981 album Live at the Ritz.

Sampled
DTV set The El Dorados' version of the song to the Silly Symphony The Wise Little Hen.
De La Soul sampled The El Dorados' version on the song "Let, Let Me In" that was featured on their 1991 album De La Soul Is Dead.

References

1955 songs
1955 singles
1960 singles
Pat Boone songs
The Righteous Brothers songs
Harry Nilsson songs
Song recordings produced by Richard Perry
Vee-Jay Records singles
Dot Records singles
Coral Records singles